Jofuska Creek'''' is a stream in the U.S. state of Mississippi. It is a tributary to the Pearl River.Jofuska '' is a name derived from the Choctaw language of uncertain meaning. Variant names are "Hurricane Creek", "Jofusha Creek" and "Smallwood Branch".

References

Rivers of Mississippi
Rivers of Neshoba County, Mississippi
Rivers of Winston County, Mississippi
Tributaries of the Pearl River (Mississippi–Louisiana)
Mississippi placenames of Native American origin